Thomas's rock rat (Aethomys thomasi) is a species of rodent in the family Muridae
found only in Angola.
Its natural habitat is subtropical or tropical dry shrubland.

References

Endemic fauna of Angola
Aethomys
Rodents of Africa
Mammals described in 1897
Taxa named by William Edward de Winton
Taxonomy articles created by Polbot